Morten Frost or Morten Frost Hansen (born 4 April 1958) is a former badminton player and later coach, who represented Denmark. As a player, he spent twelve years in the top three of the world rankings.

Badminton career
During his career, Frost won almost every available top level championship, except the World Badminton Championships where he scored a silver medal twice (1985 and 1987). When he lost his second World Championship in the finals, the headlines rang out "The World's greatest badminton player may never be World Champion."  While this may be the enduring footnote to his career, Frost dominated at the much coveted All England Open Badminton Championships. He won that tournament in 1982, 1984, 1986, and 1987. He also was European champion in 1984 and 1986. He won the Nordic championship each year from 1978 through 1984 and again in 1988.

Frost is also distinguished by winning all of the invitational Grand Prix tournaments at least once, including his home country's Denmark Open, of which he was champion 1980-1986 and 1989. Morten Frost represented Denmark on the national team from 1976 to 1991, longer than anyone else.

Noted for his exceptionally smooth and fluid footwork, Frost's playing style was something of a cross between the traditional singles game featuring numerous clears (lobs) and drops, with smashes often reserved for weak returns, and the modern singles game featuring more smashing from the outset of a rally to create openings.

Morten Frost was inducted into the BWF Badminton Hall of Fame in 1998.

Coaching career
After his playing years were over, he went on to successfully coach the Danish national team. During his tenure as coach, the Danish national squad achieved over 20 major international wins, including an Olympic gold medal in 1996, six gold medals and three silver medals at the European Championships in 1996, the men's singles titles at the 1995 and 1996 All England Championships, and a gold, two silver and four bronze medals at the World Championships in 1995. He later coached the national teams of Malaysia and South Africa. Frost also worked as a commentator on the BBC's TV coverage of the badminton tournament at the 2014 Commonwealth Games in Glasgow.

In 2015 Frost accepted a contract to be technical director of the Malaysian national team until the end of 2020. Early 2017, Frost had a fallout with Malaysian former world number 1 player Lee Chong Wei regarding what Lee said was an unfair treatment towards him after his injury. In September 2017, Frost resigned from his position in Malaysia, citing personal reasons.

In February 2019, Frost signed a one-year contract to coach India's junior players at the Prakash Padukone Badminton Academy.

Achievements

World Championships 
Men's singles

World Cup 
Men's singles
Men's doubles

World Games 
Men's singles

European Championships 
Men's singles

International tournaments finals

Singles

Wins

Men's doubles

Wins

IBF World Grand Prix (32 titles, 12 runners-up)
The World Badminton Grand Prix sanctioned by International Badminton Federation (IBF) from 1983 to 2006.

Men's singles

Men's doubles

National championships finals

Singles

Wins

Quotes
 "Jeg hader at tabe mere end de fleste. Jeg har en vilje til at vinde HVER gang!" - Morten Frost
  "I hate to lose more than most. I have the will to win EVERY time!" - Morten Frost (translation of above)
 "He used to give international players in England a 14-0 start. And if they won, the bet was they would take the money. And most of the players would take the bet, but they made very little money. After that they found they couldn't win, so they never took the bet. But that's how you train not to make errors." - Tom John on Morten Frost

References
Cited

General
 En eftermiddag med Morten Frost

Further reading

External links
 
 
 
 

1958 births
Living people
Danish male badminton players
Badminton coaches
World Games medalists in badminton
World Games silver medalists
Competitors at the 1981 World Games
People from Odsherred Municipality
Sportspeople from Region Zealand